GWR No. 36 was a prototype 4-6-0 steam locomotive constructed at Swindon Works for the Great Western Railway in 1896, the first 4-6-0 ever built for the GWR and one of the first in Britain. It was designed by William Dean and le Fleming comments that "the design is unusual and entirely Dean of the later period, including the only large boiler ever built entirely to his ideas."

Design
No. 36 had double frames for the  coupled wheels and an outside-frame bogie with  wooden-centred wheels; cylinders were 20" x 24". The long boiler and raised round-topped firebox create a harmonious impression, and the loco acquired the nickname "The Crocodile". Among its innovative features included the use of Serve tubes.

Use
It was probably due to Dean's declining state of health and Churchward's increasing influence that the loco did little work away from Swindon, remained a prototype, and was withdrawn by Churchward in 1905 with the low mileage of 171,428.

References

Sources

0036
4-6-0 locomotives
Railway locomotives introduced in 1896
Standard gauge steam locomotives of Great Britain

Freight locomotives